5656 Oldfield, provisional designation , is a background asteroid from the inner regions of the asteroid belt, approximately  in diameter. It was discovered on 8 October 1920, by astronomer Walter Baade at the Bergedorf Observatory in Hamburg, Germany. The asteroid was named for English musician Mike Oldfield.

Orbit and classification 

Oldfield is a non-family asteroid of the main belt's background population. It orbits the Sun in the inner main-belt at a distance of 1.8–3.1 AU once every 3 years and 10 months (1,409 days; semi-major axis of 2.46 AU). Its orbit has an eccentricity of 0.26 and an inclination of 4° with respect to the ecliptic.

The body's observation arc begins at Bergedorf two nights after its official discovery observation.

Physical characteristics

Diameter and albedo 

According to the survey carried out by the NEOWISE mission of NASA's Wide-field Infrared Survey Explorer, Oldfield measures 7.691 kilometers in diameter and its surface has an albedo of 0.075.

Rotation period 

As of 2018, no rotational lightcurve of Oldfield has been obtained from photometric observations. The body's rotation period, poles and shape remain unknown.

Naming 

This minor planet was named after English composer and multi-instrumentalist Mike Oldfield (born 1953), creator of the famed Tubular Bells albums. The official naming citation was proposed by Gareth V. Williams and published by the Minor Planet Center on 25 April 1994.

References

External links 
 Asteroid Lightcurve Database (LCDB), query form (info )
 Dictionary of Minor Planet Names, Google books
 Discovery Circumstances: Numbered Minor Planets (5001)-(10000) – Minor Planet Center
 
 

005656
Discoveries by Walter Baade
Named minor planets
19201008